The March 881 was a Formula One racing car designed by Adrian Newey (his first ever F1 car) and raced by March Racing Team in the  season by Italian Ivan Capelli and the debuting Maurício Gugelmin from Brazil.  The car's best result was a second place driven by Capelli at the 1988 Portuguese Grand Prix.

1988
The March 881 used the then new to Formula One Judd V8 engine, and was consistently the fastest speed trapped 'atmo' car of the 1988 season, with Capelli clocked at a class fastest  on the first straight at Hockenheim for the German Grand Prix. Capelli and his March 881 was the only non-turbo car/driver combination in 1988 to actually lead a Grand Prix when he briefly took the lead from Alain Prost in his McLaren-Honda as they crossed the start-finish line on lap 16 of the Japanese Grand Prix at Suzuka. This was also the first time since the  season that a naturally aspirated car had led a Formula One Grand Prix.

Capelli finished the season in 7th place with 17 points, while Gugelmin generally impressed most by finished his debut season in 13th place with 5 points. March finished the year 6th in the Constructors' Championship with 22 points.

1989
With the  car, the CG891, only being completed in time for the Monaco Grand Prix, the team were forced to use the 881 for the first two races of the year, in Brazil and San Marino. Gugelmin drove the 881 to third place at his home race in Brazil, close behind the Ferrari of Nigel Mansell and the McLaren-Honda of Prost. However, these would turn out to be the team's only points of 1989, as the CG891 was off the pace and unreliable.

Complete Formula One results
(key)

* All 4 points in  scored using the March 881.

References

1988 Formula One season cars
1989 Formula One season cars
March Formula One cars